William Derrick may refer to:
 William B. Derrick (1843–1913), African Methodist Episcopal bishop and missionary
 William S. Derrick (1802–1852), American politician from Pennsylvania